Richmond (Māori: Waimea) is a town and the seat of the Tasman District Council in New Zealand. The town, first settled by Europeans in 1842, was named in 1854 after the town of Richmond on Thames near London.

Although most of Richmond lies outside the boundaries of Nelson City and the town is considered a separate urban area, Richmond is part of the wider Nelson metropolitan area along with nearby Brightwater, Hope, Māpua and Wakefield. The two unitary authorities (Nelson and Tasman) co-operate for tourism-marketing purposes via "Latitude Nelson".  Richmond forms part of the Nelson parliamentary electorate.

History

During the period 1853 to 1876, the Richmond urban area was administered as part of Nelson Province. With the Abolition of Provinces Act 1876, Waimea County was created, effective in January 1877. Richmond was included in the Waimea County boundaries, and served as the administrative headquarters of the county.

In 1891, the administrative authority for the urban area of Richmond was transferred from Waimea County to the Richmond Borough Council.

Richmond Borough existed until the 1989 local government reforms, when the Tasman District was formed through the amalgamation of the Richmond Borough, Golden Bay County, Murchison County and Waimea County administrative areas.

Demographics

The Daelyn statistical area, covering , is the sole area of Richmond within Nelson City; the remaining eight areas are within Tasman District.

Richmond had a population of 15,279 at the 2018 New Zealand census, an increase of 1,896 people (14.2%) since the 2013 census, and an increase of 2,859 people (23.0%) since the 2006 census. There were 5,739 households. There were 7,338 males and 7,944 females, giving a sex ratio of 0.92 males per female, with 2,805 people (18.4%) aged under 15 years, 2,442 (16.0%) aged 15 to 29, 6,456 (42.3%) aged 30 to 64, and 3,579 (23.4%) aged 65 or older.

Ethnicities were 93.0% European/Pākehā, 6.9% Māori, 1.2% Pacific peoples, 3.5% Asian, and 1.8% other ethnicities (totals add to more than 100% since people could identify with multiple ethnicities).

The proportion of people born overseas was 16.7%, compared with 27.1% nationally.

Although some people objected to giving their religion, 53.8% had no religion, 35.9% were Christian, 0.3% were Hindu, 0.3% were Muslim, 0.9% were Buddhist and 1.3% had other religions.

Of those at least 15 years old, 2,007 (16.1%) people had a bachelor or higher degree, and 2,664 (21.4%) people had no formal qualifications. The employment status of those at least 15 was that 5,499 (44.1%) people were employed full-time, 1,968 (15.8%) were part-time, and 351 (2.8%) were unemployed.

Economy

Richmond Mall

Richmond Mall opened in 1973. It covers an area of 23,142 m² and has 800 carparks and 70 stores, including Farmers, Pak'nSave and FreshChoice.

Education

General public schools

There are two state primary schools for Year 1 to 6 students:
Richmond School, with a roll of 
Henley School, with a roll of 
In addition, there is a primary school at Appleby

Specialist schools

It was established on 1916, on a homestead established by William McRae in 1850.

Roman Catholic schools

Gallery

See also
Nelson
Tasman District
Hope
Brightwater
Wakefield

References

External links 

 Richmond Unlimited

 
Populated places in the Tasman District
Populated places around Tasman Bay / Te Tai-o-Aorere